is a racing arcade game that was released by Namco in 1995.  It runs on their System 22 hardware, and allows up to four people to play it simultaneously when two 2-player cabinets are linked together.

Gameplay
Players must choose one of three different types of motorcycles (the Anthias for novice players, the NVR750R for amateur ones and the Wild Hog for experts).  There are also two hidden motorcycles named the NVR750RSP and Back Anthias, that may be activated by entering a code into the cabinet, but it varies based on if the player is red (Player 1) or yellow (Player 3), or black (Player 2) or blue (Player 4). The CPU-controlled green motorcycles in the game are also based on the cycles from 1992's Suzuka 8 Hours, and there are two different circuits to choose from (Green Hill, which is named after one of the circuits of 1993's Suzuka 8 Hours 2 and aimed at novice players, and Neo Yokohama, which is aimed at expert ones) along with seven background music tracks (four on both circuits, but the fourth for both is "New Music"); there's even a Ridge Racer-style view change button that allows players to switch from third-person to first-person view (and back again), and four different best-time tables (two for each circuit, with the first being for solo play, and the second being for link play).

Reception
In Japan, Game Machine listed Cyber Cycles on their August 1, 1995 issue as being the fourth most-successful dedicated arcade game of the month. Next Generation reviewed the arcade version of the game, rating it four stars out of five, and stated that "there's no mediocrity here. Namco's newest entry into the cycling arena [...] is an improvement through and through to the degree that it's really no longer in the same league."

References

External links

Cyber Cycles at the Arcade History database

1995 video games
Arcade video games
Motorcycle video games
Multiplayer and single-player video games
Racing video games
Video games set in Japan